Efrat Abramov (born March 3, 1980) is an Israeli TV presenter, journalist and screenwriter.

Residing in Tel Aviv, Israel, to a family of Jewish background. Abramov was the host of the daily Bip comedy channel show "Mahadoora Mugbelet" (English: "Limited Edition").
Then she was selected to write and host the TV aftershow "The little sister" –  a satire late night that followed the events of "HaAh HaGadol" (The Big Brother)" show in Israel. Abramov hosted the show for 3 seasons,  (150 episodes) that dealt with seasons 1, 2 and the first VIP season. The show terminated due to the closure of Bip channel in the end of 2010.

Since 2008 Abramov is a columnist in the Israeli newspaper Globes.

References

1980 births
Israeli female screenwriters
Israeli television actresses
Living people